Ležiachov is a village and municipality in Martin District in the Žilina Region of northern Slovakia.

History
In historical records the village was first mentioned in 1252.

Geography
The municipality lies at an altitude of 437 metres and covers an area of 4.232 km². It has a population of about 143 people.

External links
https://web.archive.org/web/20061230185723/http://www.statistics.sk/mosmis/eng/run.html

Villages and municipalities in Martin District